is a railway station in Adachi, Tokyo, Japan, operated by the private railway operator Tobu Railway.

Lines

Station layout
The station consists of one island platform serving two tracks. There are two additional tracks that are used by trains skipping this stop.

Platforms

History
The station opened on 21 March 1900.

From 17 March 2012, station numbering was introduced on all Tobu lines, with Takenotsuka Station becoming "TS-14".

See also
 List of railway stations in Japan

References

External links

 Takenotsuka Station information 

Tobu Skytree Line
Stations of Tobu Railway
Railway stations in Tokyo
Railway stations in Japan opened in 1900